Shitara Dam is a gravity dam located in Aichi Prefecture in Japan. The dam is used for flood control, irrigation and water supply. The catchment area of the dam is 62.2 km2. The dam impounds about 300  ha of land when full and can store 98000 thousand cubic meters of water. The construction of the dam was started on 1978.

References

Dams in Aichi Prefecture
1978 establishments in Japan